is a Japanese manga series written and illustrated by Gō Ikeyamada. It premiered in Shōjo Comic from December 2006 to October 2008. The individual chapters were collected and published in 10 tankōbon volumes by Shogakukan. Two of its chapters are used in Gō Ikeyamada's Shōnen x Cinderella. The manga is licensed in Taiwan by Tong Li Publishing, in Indonesia by Tiga Lancar Semesta, and in France by Kurokawa.

Story
Yamate Midori is a 15-year-old girl who is described as a tomboy. One day, Midori meets a boy called Hino Tsukasa, who came to the island she lives on for vacation. He teaches her to play soccer, and she falls in love with the sport. Inspired by Tsukasa, Midori continues to play soccer, hoping to meet him again someday. When they do meet again, Tsukasa seduces Midori on their first date. To convince her to give up her virginity, which she'd been saving for her future husband, Tsukasa tells Midori they will get married in the future.  

The next day, Midori finds Tsukasa demanding payment from his teammates for having won a bet, laughing about how easy it is to get a 'country girl' to become intimate with him, and speculating that he will continue to do so a few more times before leaving her. When he discovers that she heard all of this, he tells her that she is at fault for being too trusting, and that she should be proud to have had such an encounter with a future soccer star like himself. 

Determined to defeat Tsukasa at soccer and bring him down for betraying her trust, Midori disguises herself as a boy, enrols at the rival All-Boys High School, and joins their soccer team. Despite this, a boy in her dorm finds out about her actual gender almost immediately.

Characters

Main Characters

 (Drama CD), Rie Kugimiya (Digicomi Version)
 15 years old. She is a 1st year girl disguised as a boy at Aoba 3rd High School, living in Aoba 3rd dormitory. She has a part-time job as a waitress to help support herself financially. At the beginning of the series, she falls in love with Tsukasa, but as a result of his behavior, her feelings become mixed and conflicting. During the series, she begins to develop feelings toward Kazuma, and at the end of the manga, she calls out Kazuma's name while she is asleep. She decides to let go of her first love, Tsukasa, in order to pursue her feelings for Kazuma. Eventually, Midori marries Kazuma and has a daughter named Akane, and they move to Midori's island to start a new life. There, Midori, Kazuma, and Akane are reunited with Tsukasa, his wife, and son Kakeru.

 (Drama CD, Game), Hiroyuki Yoshino (Digicomi Version)
15 years old. He is a 1st year at Aoba 3rd High School, who lives in Aoba 3rd dormitory and knows Midori is a girl. He loves Midori, acts as her protector, and is willing to do anything to keep her smiling. He is willing to put his own feelings and happiness aside if it means he can help Midori. He is usually even seen helping her get closer to Tsukasa because he thinks that will make her happy. In the end, Midori confesses her love to Kazuma, and they begin dating. He proposes to her after graduation. Years later, they get married and have a daughter named Akane.

 (Drama CD, Game), Yuichi Nakamura (Digicomi Version)
17 years old. He is a 2nd year at Josei High School and is the soccer club's best player. He seduced Midori and lied to her to make her become intimate with him for entertainment and as a bet with his friends. When Midori discovers this, he tells her she should not have trusted him so easily, but that she would be able to brag about being intimate with someone so far out of her league. He eventually falls in love with Midori, but he cannot show his feelings directly because of his past. Despite this, he constantly harasses her sexually when they are alone. Tsukasa also gets very jealous whenever Midori smiles due to Kazuma. They eventually reconcile when Midori discovers his past and they date for a while, but it doesn't work out. Tsukasa later marries and has a son named Kakeru.

Aoba 3rd High School

 (Drama CD, game)
 A 2nd year at Aoba 3rd High School. He is Aoba 3rd soccer club striker. He is the son of Sagara Yuki and Moriyama Miki and the boyfriend of Mamoru Kaji. His body is also small like his father's.

 A 2nd year at Aoba 3rd High School. He is Aoba 3rd soccer club's striker. He is Hodaka Ryu's son. He is Kouki's best friend and dating his little sister, Maki Sagara

 (Drama CD, game)
 A 1st year at Aoba 3rd High School. He lives at Aoba 3rd dormitory in room 204. He is Miyu Motoyama's boyfriend. He is small like Kouki.

 (Drama CD, game)
 A 1st year at Aoba 3rd High School. He lives at Aoba 3rd dormitory in room 203.

 (Drama CD, game)
 A 1st year at Aoba 3rd High School. He lives at Aoba 3rd dormitory in room 205.

 (Drama CD, game)
 A 2nd year at Aoba 3rd High School. He is the Aoba 3rd soccer club's striker. He recognizes that Midori is a girl at first sight. He often skips soccer practice, and he is a playboy.

 (Drama CD, game)
 A 3rd year at Aoba 3rd High School. He is the Aoba 3rd soccer club's goal keeper and captain.

 (Drama CD, game)
 A 3rd year at Aoba 3rd High School. He is Aoba 3rd soccer club's defender and a troublemaker.

Josei High School

 (Drama CD, game)
 Tsukasa's friend in the Josei soccer club. He knows all of Tsukasa's dark past and problems. He knows Midori is a girl.

 Tsukasa's junior in the Josei soccer club.

 (Drama CD, game)

Other Characters

 Midori's mother. She is a single parent.

 Daughter of Tamotsu Kaji from Get Love!!. She is Kouki's girlfriend.

 A shy girl who later becomes Jin's girlfriend. She is Midori's friend at the cafe where Midori has part time job as a waitress.

 She fell in love at first sight with Masato after he helped her. She is Midori's friend at the cafe where Midori has part time job as a waitress.

 Kouki's little sister and Kei's girlfriend.

Media

Manga

Uwasa no Midori-kun!! was written and illustrated by Gō Ikeyamada. It was serialized in Shogakukan's Shōjo Comic in December 2006 where it ran until its conclusion in October 2008. The individual chapters were collected and published in ten tankōbon volumes by Shogakukan. Two of its chapters are used in Gō Ikeyamada's Shōnen x Cinderella.

Games
The manga was adapted into a Nintendo DS game called , which was released by Idea Factory on September 20, 2007. On August 21, 2008, Idea Factory released another Nintendo DS game for the series called .

Drama CD
Based on the manga, a Drama CD, called Uwasa no Midori-kun!! Futari no Oji to Hadaka Hime no Fukushu, was released on March 5, 2008, by Sony Music Entertainment. The songs are sung by Hikaru Midorikawa, Akira Ishida, Romi Park and Kazuya Nakai.

Reception
The fifth volume of Uwasa no Midori-kun!! was ranked 10th on the Tohan charts between October 30 and November 5, 2007. The ninth volume of Uwasa no Midori-kun!! was ranked 8th on the Tohan charts between August 26 and September 1, 2008. The tenth volume of Uwasa no Midori-kun!! was ranked 22nd on the Tohan charts between October 21 to 27, 2008 and 13th on the Tohan charts between October 28 and November 3, 2008.

References

External links

Official Idea Factory Uwasa no Midori-kun!! Natsu Iro Striker game website 
Official Idea Factory Uwasa no Midori-kun!! Futari no Midori!? game website 

2006 manga
Association football in anime and manga
Cross-dressing in anime and manga
Nintendo DS games
Romantic comedy anime and manga
Shogakukan franchises
Shōjo manga